Welborn Historic District is a national historic district located at Mount Vernon, Posey County, Indiana.  The district encompasses 154 contributing buildings and 5 contributing structures in a predominantly residential section of Mount Vernon laid out by Jesse Welborn between 1822 and 1826.  It developed between about 1840 and 1942, and includes notable examples of Greek Revival, Gothic Revival, Italianate, Romanesque Revival, and Colonial Revival style architecture. Notable contributing buildings include the Gov. Alvin P. Hovey House (c. 1847, 1871), Edward Sullivan House (1860), C.P. Klein House Johnson-Rosenbaum House (1905), St. Matthew's Catholic Church (1880), First Presbyterian Church (1872), Trinity Evangelical Church (1883), St. John's Episcopal Church (1892), Mount Vernon Post Office (1931).

It was listed on the National Register of Historic Places in 1992.

References

Mount Vernon, Indiana
Historic districts on the National Register of Historic Places in Indiana
Greek Revival architecture in Indiana
Gothic Revival architecture in Indiana
Romanesque Revival architecture in Indiana
Italianate architecture in Indiana
Colonial Revival architecture in Indiana
Historic districts in Posey County, Indiana
National Register of Historic Places in Posey County, Indiana